Rayzam Shah Wan Sofian (born January 11, 1988) is a Malaysian track and field athlete specialising in the high hurdles. He twice competed at World Championships, in 2009 and 2013, without reaching the semifinals.

Athletics career
His personal best is 13.67 seconds, set in Weinheim, Germany on 27 May 2017.

Competition record

References

1988 births
Living people
People from Sabah
Malaysian people of Malay descent
Malaysian male hurdlers
Malaysian Muslims
World Athletics Championships athletes for Malaysia
Athletes (track and field) at the 2018 Commonwealth Games
Athletes (track and field) at the 2018 Asian Games
Southeast Asian Games medalists in athletics
Southeast Asian Games gold medalists for Malaysia
Southeast Asian Games silver medalists for Malaysia
Competitors at the 2007 Southeast Asian Games
Competitors at the 2011 Southeast Asian Games
Competitors at the 2013 Southeast Asian Games
Competitors at the 2015 Southeast Asian Games
Competitors at the 2017 Southeast Asian Games
Competitors at the 2019 Southeast Asian Games
Asian Games competitors for Malaysia
Commonwealth Games competitors for Malaysia
Islamic Solidarity Games competitors for Malaysia